Manohar Thana is a census town in Jhalawar district in the Indian state of Rajasthan.
This town in Jhalawar district, located in the southeast of Rajasthan. It is situated at a short distance from the Rajasthan - Madhya Pradesh border and about 12 km from the town to the Madhya Pradesh border. Manohar Thana is Gram Panchayat and Panchayat Samiti, Tehsil comes under Manohar Thana. This village is surrounded by three more rivers. From two sides it is surrounded by the Ghodapachhad river (here it is also called Kalikhad river) coming from Madhya Pradesh and Parvan river from another . Outside the village, Kalikhad joins the Parvan River, which is called the Sangam Sthal.

There is a park around the village which was built in ancient times by a king named Raja Manohar Bhil . In this second water fort of Rajasthan, even today the ruined rooms, baths etc. of the time of kings can be seen. Also here the ancient Kali Mata temple is also in the fort itself. The Rani Sati temple is worth visiting here, where a fair is held every year on Chaturdashi and Amavasya of Bhadrapada Krishna Paksha. At the same time, the history of Bhil king Chakrasen Bhil makes this region proud. Until a few years ago, there used to be dense forests around, but now all have been cut. This town is the center of business for about 50 nearby villages. There is also Krishi Upaj Mandi where farmers come to sell their crops.

History 
Manohar Thana was developed by a Bhil emperor Manohar bheel. one time , Manohar Thana was ruled by Bhil king Chakrasen, in his army there were 500 Bhil horseman  and 800 archers.

Some historians of India believe that that was Munavvar Khan that is unbelievable because In the Manohar Thana fort have Maa Kankali temple about 1200 AC. Here is a tunnel about 15–20 km which opens from Manoharthana fort and goes to Khatakhedi village. Kaamheda Hanuman temple is the spiritual center of Jhalawar district whereas thousands of devotees come from various states of India.

Social community:  Lodha Rajput and Tanwar are the largest communities of this area.Like Lodha Rajput (Thakur), Karar (Mehta), Bheel, Brahmin, Bania etc. all live in harmony

Demographics
 India census, Manohar Than a had a population of 9227. Males constitute 52% of the population and females 48%. Manohar Thana has an average literacy rate of 64%, higher than the national average of 59.5%: male literacy is 73%, and female literacy is 54%. In Manohar Thana, 18% of the population is under 6 years of age. Manohar Thana is the cherapunji of Rajasthan and Kamkheda Hanuman Temple is most religious tourism palace

Manohar Thana Fort
Manohar Thana Fort is one of several forts situated in Rajasthan. Manohar Thana Fort is located at a distance of 90 km from Jhalawar. The literal meaning of its name is ‘Beautiful Outpost’. The fort stands witness to the merging of the two rivers, namely Parvan and Kalikhad. It has double layered fortification and battlements because, in the ancient times, the location was significant from the security point of view.
It also has a Maa Kali Temple which seems to be formed in 1200 AC. Manohar Thana fort is one of the best tourist destinations in Jhalawar District.

Parvan and Kalikhar
Parvan, one of the longer rivers of Rajasthan, enters into Rajasthan from Khatakhedi village of Manoharthana tehsil. River Kalikhad enters also from Madhya Pradesh. Both rivers are met to each other at the west of Manoharthana town where the fort is situated. Every year in the Manoharthana town a fair is organised by Panchayat for the duration of 1 month.

Business
Manohar Thana is also a business hub for hundreds of villages situated adjacent to it. Businesses like grain and oilseed trading flourish here.
There is also a sub mandi for agriculture crops.

Manohar Thana was developed by a Bhil emperor Manohar bheel. one time , Manohar Thana was ruled by Bhil king Chakrasen, in his army there were 500 Bhil horseman  and 800 archers. 

Some historians of India believe that that was Munavvar Khan that is unbelievable because In the Manohar Thana fort have Maa Kankali temple about 1200 AC. Here is a tunnel about 15–20 km which opens from Manoharthana fort and goes to Khatakhedi village. Kaamheda Hanuman temple is the spiritual center of Jhalawar district whereas thousands of devotees come from various states of India.

Social community:  Lodha Rajput and Tanwar are the largest communities of this area.Like Lodha Rajput (Thakur), Karar (Mehta), Bheel, Brahmin, Bania etc. all live in harmony.

Notable people
Vitthal Prasad Sharma, politician

References

Cities and towns in Jhalawar district